Sairaj Patil (born 31 October 1996) is an Indian cricketer. He made his Twenty20 debut for Mumbai in the 2016–17 Inter State Twenty-20 Tournament on 29 January 2017. He made his List A debut on 8 December 2021, for Mumbai in the 2021–22 Vijay Hazare Trophy.

References

External links
 

1996 births
Living people
Indian cricketers
Mumbai cricketers
Cricketers from Maharashtra